The Pasir Mas railway station is a Malaysian railway station located at and named after the town of Pasir Mas, Kelantan. It is also the starting interchange of the disused Rantau Panjang Line. A new railway station which replaced the original railway station was completed in July 2008.

From Pasir Mas there is a railway straight to Kuala Lumpur. The railway starts from Gemas. From Pasir Mas, there are several small stations en route like Temangan, Tok Uban and many more. This railway also connects to Kuala Kerai Station, one of the largest stations in Kelantan. A small station near this area is named Jerek. This station is also mostly used as a commerce hub for the city area.

Train services
 Ekspres Rakyat Timuran 26/27 Tumpat–JB Sentral
 Shuttle Timur 51/52/57/60 Tumpat–Gua Musang
 Shuttle Timur 55/56 Tumpat–Dabong

See also

 Rail transport in Malaysia

Pasir Mas District
Railway stations opened in 1914
KTM East Coast Line stations
Railway stations in Kelantan